Leandro de Santo Agostinho da Piedade, O.A.D. (1688–1740) was a Roman Catholic prelate who served as Bishop of São Tomé e Príncipe (1738–1740).

Biography
Leandro de Santo Agostinho da Piedade was born on 14 Nov 1688 in Lisbon, Portugal and ordained a priest in the Order of Discalced Augustinians on 31 Dec 1712.
He was ordained a deacon in the order on 27 Dec 1713.
On 21 Jul 1738, he was selected as the Bishop of São Tomé e Príncipe and confirmed by Pope Clement XII on 3 Sep 1738.
On 25 Jan 1739, he was consecrated bishop by Tomás de Almeida, Patriarch of Lisbon, with Manoel da Cruz Nogueira, Bishop of São Luís do Maranhão, and Luiz de Santa Teresa da Cruz Salgado de Castilho, Bishop of Olinda, serving as co-consecrators. 
He served as Bishop of São Tomé e Príncipe until his death in 1740.

References 

18th-century Roman Catholic bishops in São Tomé and Príncipe
Bishops appointed by Pope Clement XII
1688 births
1740 deaths
People from Lisbon
Discalced Augustinian bishops
Portuguese Roman Catholic bishops in Africa
Roman Catholic bishops of São Tomé and Príncipe